I Am Kalam is a 2011 Indian Hindi-language drama film produced by the non-governmental charity Smile Foundation and directed by Nila Madhab Panda, cinematography by Mohana Krishna. The character of Chhotu has been performed by Harsh Mayar. The film was screened in the market section at the 63rd Cannes Film Festival on 12 May 2010. It has been showcased in various film festivals and has received many awards and honours. The film was screened retrospective on 17 August 2016 at the Independence Day Film Festival jointly presented by the Indian Directorate of Film Festivals and Ministry of Defense, commemorating 70th Indian Independence Day.

Cast 
 Harsh Mayar as Chhotu/Kalam
 Hussan Saad as Prince Ranvijay Singh
 Gulshan Grover as Bhati, Dhaba owner
 Dharmveer Jakhar as Social Activist
 Beatrice Ordeix (French actress) as Lucy
 Pitobash Tripathy as Laptan
 Meena Mir as Chhotu's mother
 Suresh Acharya as Lakha's assistant
 Biswajeet Bal as Sukha Singh
 Rajat Bhalla as Police Havaldar
 Garima Bharadwaj as Rani Sa
 Sanjay Chauhan as Raja Rudra Pratap Singh
 S.D. Chouhan as Ranvijay's worker

Plot 
This is the story of a boy Chotu, from a poor family who works as a child labourer at a highway-side cafe (aka dhaba). Irrespective of the problems in his life, he is a happy child with a simple dream to become someone like Dr. APJ Abdul Kalam. 

The plot has the protagonist Chotu being sent to a dhaba to work and earn for the family. Here, he befriends the royal heir, Rannvijay, of a neighbouring resort's owner, who’s his age. Every day, Chotu dreams of wearing a tie and uniform to go to school, just like Rannvijay, as he has an unusual thirst for education and knowledge. He then chances upon the Republic Day Parade and Dr. Kalam’s salutation march. Curious, he finds out about the President and instantly decides to become like him. From here, he begins to call himself Kalam.

As the story progresses, he meets a foreigner woman who tries to convince his mother to let him study as he is a bright kid, but since the family's circumstances aren’t in favour, he is denied an education. As a consequence, Chotu aka Kalam decides to run away to Delhi to meet the President and give him a letter. In this, he writes about how he wants to become like the President of India and thanks Dr. Kalam for making him realise his dreams. Meanwhile, every one from his family comes running after Chotu to find him in the new city. They finally track him down and a relieved Rannvijay and zealous Chotu hug each other with joy.

In the end, Rannvijay’s father offers Chotu’s mother work at his resort and agrees to pay for Chotu’s education and send him to the same school as Rannvijay’s. That is when Chotu says he wants to pay for his education on his own and the movie ends with both Chotu aka Kalam and Rannvijay boarding the school bus in their school uniforms.

Conclusion:

The plot shows that equality in education is still a mere thought and that ideas are still being built around the education for underprivileged. The movie is, without a doubt, an eye-opener for the education sector in India.

Location 
The film was shot in Bikaner, Rajasthan of India.

Release 
I Am Kalam released in India screens on 5 August 2011. A special screening was held for Dr. A.P.J. Abdul Kalam at his Delhi residence on 29 July. The film was acquired and distributed by Ultra Media & Entertainment.

Reception

Critical response 

Rajeev Masand of News18 praised the acting performances of all actors specially Harsh Mayar who played the character of Kalam. Masand also complimented the script which he felt was very well written because it integrated a very important message about education in its screenplay without being melodramatic. Masand gave the film a rating of 3.5 out of 5. Mayank Shekhar of Hindustan Times found the film to be "sweet and engaging" and gave it a rating of 3 out of 5 appreciating its realistic nature. Shubhra Gupta of The Indian Express gave the film a rating of 3.5 out of 5 while praising its good intentions and the performances of all actors. Namrata Joshi of Outlook praised the positive nature of the film but found the pacing to be slow. Namrata gave the film a rating of 2 out of 5 saying that "It’s a straight, simple story with no great highs and lows". Amy L. Hayden of Time Out found the film "heartwarming and inspirational" but felt that American kids might not be able to relate to it. The film was rated 4.60 on 5 by audiences at the Transilvania International Film Festival. The Times of India gave it 4.5 stars out of 5, commented " It's inspirational, intelligent, topical and entertaining too. More importantly, it brims over with heart and soul, leaving no one untouched with its simple message of providing an equal opportunity". DNA also gave it 4.5 out of 5 stars, saying "At a little over 90 minutes, I Am Kalam is a gripping watch that leaves you feeling uplifted and positive".

Awards and nominations 
 Int'l Film Festival of India (IFFI),Goa by Young Jury for Best Feature Film
 National Film Award for Best Child Artist 2011 –  Harsh Mayar.  He won it along with two other children
 Lucas Film Festival, Germany for Best Feature Film
 Int'l Jury at Ale Kino Int'l Film Festival, Poland for Special Mention
 Don Quixote Prize of the International Ciné-Club Federation (ICCF) at the Lucas Film Festival
 Special Diploma for the Best Actor Work at Minsk International Film Festival "Listapad", 2011
 Aravindan Award for Best Debutante Director
 57th Filmfare Awards for Best Story to Sanjay Chauhan
 Best Child Actor award at Silent River Film Festival (SRFF), California, 2011
 Special Mention to Harsh Mayar at the 17th International Children's Film Festival of India, 2011

Nominations 
 Mumbai Int'l Film Festival (MAMI) for Indian Frame Showcase

References

External links 
 

2010s Hindi-language films
2010 films
Indian children's films
Films set in Rajasthan
A. P. J. Abdul Kalam
Films scored by Abhishek Ray
Films scored by Papon
Films scored by Sushmit Bose
2010 directorial debut films